The western silvery minnow (Hybognathus argyritis)  is a freshwater fish native to North America where it is found in the Missouri River basin, the Mississippi River drainage from the mouth of the Missouri River to the mouth of Ohio River, and the South Saskatchewan River in Alberta.

References 

Hybognathus
Fish of North America
Fish described in 1856
Taxa named by Charles Frédéric Girard